The year 591 BC was a year of the pre-Julian Roman calendar. In the Roman Empire, it was known as year 163 Ab urbe condita . The denomination 591 BC for this year has been used since the early medieval period, when the Anno Domini calendar era became the prevalent method in Europe for naming years.

Events

Births

Deaths
 King Zhuang of Chu, king of Chu

References